Cristian Bartoloni (born 26 August 1995) is an Argentinian rugby union player, currently playing for Top10 side Colorno. His preferred position is prop.

He then represented Soyaux Angoulême in 2017.

In 2015 he was named in Argentina Under 20 squad and in 2016 and 2017 in Argentina XV team.

References

External links
itsrugby.co.uk Profile

1995 births
Living people
Argentine rugby union players
Rugby union props
Jaguares (Super Rugby) players
Rugby Colorno players